Holmes County Courthouse may refer to:

Holmes County Courthouse (Ohio), Millersburg, Ohio
Holmes County Courthouse (Mississippi), Lexington, Mississippi, listed on the National Register of Historic Places